The governor-general of Australia is the representative of the monarch, currently King Charles III, in Australia. The governor-general is appointed by the monarch on the recommendation of government ministers. The governor-general has formal presidency over the Federal Executive Council and is commander-in-chief of the Australian Defence Force. The functions of the governor-general include appointing ministers, judges, and ambassadors; giving royal assent to legislation passed by parliament; issuing writs for election; and bestowing Australian honours.

In general, the governor-general observes the conventions of the Westminster system and responsible government, maintaining a political neutrality, and acts only on the advice of the prime minister or other ministers or, in certain cases, parliament. The governor-general also has a ceremonial role: hosting events at either of the two official residencesGovernment House in the capital, Canberra, and Admiralty House in Sydneyand travelling throughout Australia to open conferences, attend services and commemorations, and generally provide encouragement to individuals and groups who are contributing to their communities. When travelling abroad, the governor-general is seen as the representative of Australia and its monarch. The governor-general is supported by a staff (of 80 in 2018) headed by the official secretary to the governor-general of Australia.

A governor-general is not appointed for a specific term, but is generally expected to serve for five years subject to a possible short extension. Since 1 July 2019, the governor-general has been General David Hurley.

From Federation in 1901 until 1965, 11 out of the 15 governors-general were British aristocrats; they included six barons, two viscounts, two earls, and one royal duke. Since then, all but one of the governors-general have been Australian-born; the exception, Sir Ninian Stephen, arrived in Australia as a teenager. Only one governor-general, Dame Quentin Bryce (2008–2014), has been a woman.

Appointment

The governor-general is formally appointed by the monarch of Australia, in terms of letters patent issued by the monarch at some time during their reign and counter-signed by the then prime minister. When a new governor-general is to be appointed, the current prime minister recommends a name to the monarch, who by convention accepts that recommendation. The monarch then permits the recommendation to be publicly announced, usually several months before the end of the existing governor-general's term. During these months, the person recommended is referred to as the governor-general-designate.  After receiving their commission, the new governor-general takes an Oath of Allegiance to the monarch and an Oath of Office.  These oaths are administered by the chief justice of Australia or another senior judge. Traditionally, the ceremony takes place in the Senate chamber.

Tenure
The constitution does not set a term of office, so a governor-general may continue to hold office for any agreed length of time. In recent decades the typical term of office has been five years. Some early governors-general were appointed to terms of just one year (Lord Tennyson) or two years (Lord Forster; later extended). At the end of this initial term, a commission may be extended for a short time, usually to avoid conflict with an election or during political difficulties.

Three governors-general have resigned their commission. The first governor-general, Lord Hopetoun, asked to be recalled to Britain in 1903 over a dispute about funding for the post. Sir John Kerr resigned in 1977, with his official reason being his decision to accept the position of Australian Ambassador to UNESCO in Paris, a post which ultimately he did not take up, but the resignation also being motivated by the 1975 constitutional controversy. In 2003, ex-Archbishop Peter Hollingworth voluntarily stood aside while controversial allegations against him were managed, and the letters patent of the office were amended to take account of this circumstance. He later stepped down over the church's handling of allegations of sexual abuse of boys, for which he apologised before the Royal Commission into Institutional Responses to Child Sexual Abuse in 2016. In 1961, Lord Dunrossil became the first and, to date, only governor-general to die while holding office.

A vacancy occurs on the resignation, death, or incapacity of the governor-general. A temporary vacancy occurs when the governor-general is overseas on official business representing Australia. A temporary vacancy also occurred in 2003 when Peter Hollingworth stood aside.

Section 4 of the constitution allows the Monarch to appoint an administrator to carry out the role of governor-general when there is a vacancy. By convention, the longest-serving state governor holds a dormant commission, allowing an assumption of office to commence whenever a vacancy occurs. In 1975, Labor Prime Minister Gough Whitlam advised the Queen that Sir Colin Hannah, then Governor of Queensland, should have his dormant commission revoked for having made public and partisan anti-Whitlam Government political statements, in violation of the convention that state governors and federal governors-general remain neutral and above politics.

Dismissal

A governor-general may be recalled or dismissed by the monarch before their term is complete. By convention, this may only be upon advice from the prime minister, who retains responsibility for selecting an immediate replacement or letting the vacancy provisions take effect. The constitutional crisis of 1975 raised the possibility of the prime minister and the governor-general attempting to dismiss each other at the same time. According to William McMahon, Harold Holt considered having Lord Casey dismissed from the governor-generalship, and went as far as to have the necessary documents drawn up. Casey had twice called McMahon into Yarralumla to give him a "dressing down" over his poor relationship with Deputy Prime Minister John McEwen, which he believed was affecting the government. Holt believed that this was an improper use of his authority, but no further action was taken.

Functions

Constitutional role

The Constitution of Australia, section 2, provides:A Governor-General appointed by the Queen shall be Her Majesty's representative in the Commonwealth, and shall have and may exercise in the Commonwealth during the Queen's pleasure, but subject to this Constitution, such powers and functions of the Queen as Her Majesty may be pleased to assign to him.Such further powers are currently set out in letters patent of 2008 from Queen Elizabeth II;  these contain no substantive powers, but provide for the case of a governor-general's absence or incapacity. The constitution also provides that the governor-general is the monarch's "representative" in exercising the executive power of the Commonwealth (section 61) and as commander-in-chief of the armed forces (section 68).

Australian Solicitor-General Maurice Byers stated in 1974: "The constitutional prescription is that executive power is exercisable by the governor-general although vested in the Queen. What is exercisable is original executive power: that is, the very thing vested in the Queen by section 61. And it is exercisable by the Queen's representative, not her delegate or agent."

The 1988 Constitutional Commission report explained: "the governor-general is in no sense a delegate of the Queen. The independence of the office is highlighted by changes which have been made in recent years to the Royal Instruments relating to it."  The changes occurred in 1984 when Queen Victoria's letters patent and instructions were revoked and replaced with new letters patent, on Prime Minister Bob Hawke's advice, who stated that this would clarify the governor-general's position under the constitution.

This remains the case even when the sovereign is in the country: Solicitor-General Kenneth Bailey, prior to the first tour of Australia by its reigning monarch in 1954, explained the position by saying: the Constitution expressly vests in the Governor-General the power or duty to perform a number of the Crown's functions in the Legislature and the Executive Government of the Commonwealth... The executive power of the Commonwealth, by section 61 of the Constitution, is declared to be vested in the Queen. It is also, in the same section, declared to be "exercisable" by the Governor-General as the Queen's representative. In the face of this provision, I feel it is difficult to contend that the Queen, even though present in Australia, may exercise in person functions of executive government which are specifically assigned by the constitution to the Governor-General."
As early as 1901, the authoritative commentary by Quick and Garran had noted that the governor-general of Australia was distinguished from other Empire governors-general by the fact that "[t]he principal and most important of his powers and functions, legislative as well as executive, are expressly conferred on him by the terms of the Constitution itself ... not by Royal authority, but by statutory authority". This view was also held by Senior Judge of the Supreme Court of Tasmania Andrew Inglis Clark, who, with W. Harrison Moore (a contributor to the first draft of the constitution put before the 1897 Adelaide Convention and professor of law at the University of Melbourne), postulated that the letters patent and the royal instructions issued by Queen Victoria were unnecessary "or even of doubtful legality".

The monarch chose not to intervene during the 1975 Australian constitutional crisis, in which Governor-General Sir John Kerr dismissed the Labor government of Gough Whitlam, on the basis that such a decision is a matter "clearly placed within the jurisdiction of the Governor-General". Through her private secretary, she wrote that she "has no part in the decisions which the Governor-General must take in accordance with the Constitution".
In an address to the Sydney Institute, January 2007, in connection with that event, Sir David Smith, a retired official secretary to the governor-general of Australia who had been Kerr's official secretary in 1975, described the constitution as conferring the powers and functions of Australia's head of state on the governor-general in "his own right". He stated that the governor-general was more than a representative of the sovereign, explaining: "under section 2 of the Constitution the Governor-General is the Queen's representative and exercises certain royal prerogative powers and functions; under section 61 of the Constitution the Governor-General is the holder of a quite separate and independent office created, not by the Crown, but by the Constitution, and empowered to exercise, in his own right as Governor-General... all the powers and functions of Australia's head of state."

Role in the Australian Parliament
The constitution describes the parliament of the commonwealth as consisting of the Monarch, the Senate and the House of Representatives. Section 5 states that "the Governor-General may appoint such times for holding the sessions of the Parliament [...] prorogue the Parliament [and] dissolve the House of Representatives." These provisions make it clear that the Monarch's role in the parliament is in name only and the actual responsibility belongs to the governor-general. Such decisions are usually taken on the advice of the prime minister, although that is not stated in the constitution.

The governor-general has a ceremonial role in swearing in and accepting the resignations of members of Parliament. They appoint a deputy, to whom members make an oath of allegiance before they take their seats. On the day parliament opens, the governor-general makes a speech, entirely written by the government, explaining the government's proposed legislative program.

The most important power is found in section 58: "When a proposed law passed by both Houses of Parliament is presented to the Governor-General for the Queen's assent, he shall declare ... that he assents in the Queen's name." The royal assent brings such laws into effect, as legislation, from the date of signing.

Sections 58 to 60 allow the governor-general to withhold assent, suggest changes, refer to the Monarch or proclaim that the Monarch has annulled the legislation. A number of governors-general have reserved royal assent for particular legislation for the Monarch. Such assent has usually been given during a scheduled visit to Australia by Queen Elizabeth II. On other occasions royal assent has been given elsewhere. Examples of this have been the Flags Act (1953), the Royal Styles and Titles Acts (1953 and 1973), and the Australia Act (1986).

Role in executive government

At the start of Chapter 2 on executive government, the constitution says "The executive power of the Commonwealth is vested in the Queen and is exercisable by the Governor-General as the Queen's representative". The governor-general presides over a Federal Executive Council. By convention, the prime minister is appointed to this council and advises as to which parliamentarians shall become ministers and parliamentary secretaries.

In the constitution, the words "Governor-General-in-council" mean the governor-general acting with the advice of the Council. Powers exercised in council, which are not reserve powers, include:
 establishing government departments
 appointing federal judges, and
 appointing ambassadors and high commissioners

All such actions are taken on the advice of ministers.

Reserve powers

In the United Kingdom, the reserve powers of the monarch (which are typically referred to as the "royal prerogative") are not explicitly stated in constitutional enactments, and are the province of convention and common law. In Australia, however, the powers are explicitly given to the governor-general in the constitution; it is their use that is the subject of convention.

The reserve powers are, according to the Constitution of Australia:
 The power to dissolve (or refuse to dissolve) the House of Representatives (section 5)
 The power to dissolve Parliament on the occasion of a deadlock (section 57)
 The power to withhold assent to bills (section 58)
 The power to appoint (or dismiss) ministers (section 64)

Those powers are generally and routinely exercised on ministerial advice, but the governor-general retains the ability to act independently in certain circumstances, as governed by convention. It is generally held that the governor-general may use powers without ministerial advice in the following situations:
 if an election results in a parliament in which no party has a majority, the governor-general may select the prime minister
 if a prime minister loses the support of the House of Representatives, the governor-general may appoint a new prime minister
 if a prime minister advises a dissolution of the House of Representatives, the governor-general may refuse that request, or request further reasons why it should be granted; it is worth noting that convention does not give the governor-general the ability to dissolve either the House of Representatives or the Senate without advice

The use of the reserve powers may arise in the following circumstances:
 if a prime minister advises a dissolution of Parliament on the occasion of a deadlock between the Houses, the governor-general may refuse that request
 if the governor-general is not satisfied with a legislative bill as presented, they may refuse royal assent
 if a prime minister resigns after losing a vote of confidence, the governor-general may select a new replacement contrary to the advice of the outgoing prime minister
 if a prime minister is unable to obtain supply and refuses to resign or advise a dissolution, the governor-general may dismiss him or her and appoint a new prime minister

The above is not an exhaustive list, and new situations may arise. The most notable use of the reserve powers occurred in November 1975, in the course of the 1975 Australian constitutional crisis. On this occasion the governor-general, Sir John Kerr, dismissed the government of Gough Whitlam when the Senate withheld Supply to the government, even though Whitlam retained the confidence of the House of Representatives. Kerr determined that he had both the right and the duty to dismiss the government and commission a new government that would recommend a dissolution of the Parliament. Events surrounding the dismissal remain extremely controversial.

Biosecurity emergencies

On 18 March 2020, a human biosecurity emergency was declared in Australia owing to the risks to human health posed by the COVID-19 pandemic in Australia, after the National Security Committee met the previous day. The Biosecurity Act 2015 specifies that the governor-general may declare such an emergency exists if the health minister (Greg Hunt at the time) is satisfied that "a listed human disease is posing a severe and immediate threat, or is causing harm, to human health on a nationally significant scale". This gives the minister sweeping powers, including imposing restrictions or preventing the movement of people and goods between specified places, and evacuations. The Biosecurity (Human Biosecurity Emergency) (Human Coronavirus with Pandemic Potential) Declaration 2020 was declared by Governor-General David Hurley under Section 475 of the Act.

Ceremonial role

In addition to the formal constitutional role, the governor-general has a representative and ceremonial role, though the extent and nature of that role has depended on the expectations of the time, the individual in office at the time, the wishes of the incumbent government, and the individual's reputation in the wider community. Governors-general generally become patrons of various charitable institutions, present honours and awards, host functions for various groups of people including ambassadors to and from other countries, and travel widely throughout Australia. Sir William Deane (governor-general 1996–2001) described one of his functions as being "Chief Mourner" at prominent funerals. In Commentaries on the Constitution of the Commonwealth of Australia, Garran noted that, since the Australian executive is national in nature (being dependent on the nationally elected House of Representatives, rather than the Senate), "the Governor-General, as the official head of the Executive, does not in the smallest degree represent any federal element; if he represents anything he is the image and embodiment of national unity and the outward and visible representation of the Imperial relationship of the Commonwealth".

That role can become controversial, however, if the governor-general becomes unpopular with sections of the community. The public role adopted by Sir John Kerr was curtailed considerably after the constitutional crisis of 1975; Sir William Deane's public statements on political issues produced some hostility towards him; and some charities disassociated themselves from Peter Hollingworth after the issue of his management of sex abuse cases during his time as Anglican Archbishop of Brisbane became a matter of controversy.

Diplomatic role

The governor-general makes state visits overseas on behalf of Australia, during which an administrator of the government is appointed. The right of governors-general to make state visits was confirmed at the 1926 Imperial Conference, as it was deemed not feasible for the sovereign to pay state visits on behalf of countries other than the United Kingdom. However, an Australian governor-general did not exercise that right until 1971, when Paul Hasluck visited New Zealand. Hasluck's successor John Kerr made state visits to eight countries, but Kerr's successor Zelman Cowen made only a single state visit – to Papua New Guinea – as he wished to concentrate on travelling within Australia. All subsequent governors-general have travelled widely while in office and made multiple state visits. Occasionally governors-general have made extended tours visiting multiple countries, notably in 2009 when Quentin Bryce visited nine African countries in 19 days.

Military role

Under section 68 of the constitution, "the command in chief of the naval and military forces of the Commonwealth is vested in the Governor‑General". In practice, the associated powers over the Australian Defence Force are only exercised on the advice of the prime minister or minister for defence, on behalf of cabinet. The actual powers of the governor-general as commander-in-chief are not defined in the constitution, but rather in the Defence Act 1903 and other legislation. They include appointing the chief of the Defence Force and authorising the deployment of troops.  There is some ambiguity with regard to the role of the governor-general in declarations of war. In 1941 and 1942, the Curtin Government advised the governor-general to declare war on several Axis powers, but then had King George VI make identical proclamations on Australia's behalf. No formal declarations of war have been made since World War II, although in 1973 the Whitlam Government advised the governor-general to proclaim the end of Australia's involvement in Vietnam, despite the lack of an initiating proclamation.

The powers of command-in-chief are vested in the governor-general rather than the "Governor-General in Council", meaning there is an element of personal discretion in their exercise. For instance, in 1970 Governor-General Paul Hasluck refused Prime Minister John Gorton's request to authorise a Pacific Islands Regiment peacekeeping mission in the Territory of Papua and New Guinea, on the grounds that cabinet had not been consulted. Gorton agreed to put the matter to his ministers, and a cabinet meeting agreed that troops should only be called out if requested by the territory's administrator; this did not occur. Defence Minister Malcolm Fraser, who opposed the call out, was responsible for informing Hasluck of the prime minister's lack of consultation. The incident contributed to Fraser's resignation from cabinet in 1971 and Gorton's subsequent loss of the prime ministership.

Community role
The governor-general is generally invited to become patron of various charitable and service organisations. Historically the governor-general has also served as Chief Scout of Australia. The chief scout is nominated by the Scouting Association's National Executive Committee and is invited by the president of the Scout Association to accept the appointment. Bill Hayden declined the office on the grounds of his atheism, which was incompatible with the Scout Promise. He did however serve as the association's patron during his term of office.

Salary and privileges

Residence

By convention, the governor-general and any family occupy an official residence in Canberra, Government House (commonly referred to as Yarralumla).

Salary

The salary of the governor-general was initially set by the constitution, which fixed an annual amount of A£10,000 until the parliament decided otherwise. The constitution also provides that the salary of the governor-general cannot be "altered" during his or her term of office. Under the Governor-General Act 1974, each new commission has resulted in a pay increase. Today, the law ensures the salary is higher than that for the Chief Justice of the High Court, over a five-year period. The annual salary during Michael Jeffery's term was $365,000. Quentin Bryce's salary was $394,000. The current salary is $425,000 and there is a generous pension. Until 2001, Governors-General did not pay income tax on their salary; this was changed after Elizabeth II agreed to pay tax.

Symbols

The official cars of the governor-general fly the Flag of the Governor-General of Australia and display St. Edward's Crown instead of number plates. A similar arrangement is used for the governors of the six states. When the late Queen Elizabeth II was in Australia, the Queen's Personal Australian Flag was flown on the car in which she was travelling.

Transport

The governor-general travels in a Rolls-Royce Phantom VI limousine for ceremonial occasions, such as the State Opening of Parliament. However, for official business, the current choice of car is an armoured BMW 7 Series.

During Elizabeth II's 2011 visit to Australia, she and the Duke of Edinburgh were driven in a Range Rover Vogue.

Official dress

At one time, governors-general wore the traditional court uniform, consisting of a dark navy wool double-breasted coatee with silver oak leaf and fern embroidery on the collar and cuffs trimmed with silver buttons embossed with the Royal Arms and with bullion edged epaulettes on the shoulders, dark navy trousers with a wide band of silver oak-leaf braid down the outside seam, silver sword belt with ceremonial sword, bicorne cocked hat with plume of ostrich feathers, black patent leather Wellington boots with spurs, etc., that is worn on ceremonial occasions. There is also a tropical version made of white tropical wool cut in a typical military fashion worn with a plumed helmet. However, that custom fell into disuse during the tenure of Sir Paul Hasluck.  The governor-general now wears an ordinary lounge suit if a man or day dress if a woman.

Titles and honours
Governors-general have during their tenure the style His/Her Excellency the Honourable and their spouses have the style His/Her Excellency. Since May 2013, the style used by a former governor-general is the Honourable; it was at the same time retrospectively granted for life to all previous holders of the office.

From the creation of the Order of Australia in 1975, the governor-general was, ex officio, Chancellor and Principal Companion of the order, and therefore became entitled to the post-nominal AC. In 1976, the letters patent for the order were amended to introduce the rank of Knight and Dame to the order, and from that time the governor-general became, ex officio, the Chancellor and Principal Knight of the order. In 1986 the letters patent were amended again, and governors-general appointed from that time were again, ex officio, entitled to the post-nominal AC (although if they already held a knighthood in the order that superior rank was retained).

Until 1989, all governors-general were members of the Privy Council of the United Kingdom and thus held the additional style The Right Honourable for life. The same individuals were also usually either peers, knights, or both (the only Australian peer to be appointed as governor-general was the Lord Casey; and Sir William McKell was knighted only in 1951, some years into his term, but he was entitled to the style "The Honourable" during his tenure as premier of New South Wales, an office he held until almost immediately before his appointment). In 1989, Bill Hayden, a republican, declined appointment to the British Privy Council and any imperial honours. From that time until 2014, governors-general did not receive automatic titles or honours, other than the post-nominal AC by virtue of being Chancellor and Principal Companion of the Order of Australia. Dame Quentin Bryce was the first governor-general to have had no prior title or pre-nominal style. She was in office when, on 19 March 2014, Elizabeth II, acting on the advice of Prime Minister Tony Abbott, amended the letters patent of the Order of Australia to provide, inter alia, that the governor-general would be, ex officio, Principal Knight or Principal Dame of the order. Until 2015, the honour continued after the retirement from office of the governor-general. Formerly, all governors-general automatically became a knight upon being sworn in.

Spouses of governors-general have no official duties but carry out the role of a vice-regal consort. They are entitled to the courtesy style Her Excellency or His Excellency during the office-holder's term of office. Most spouses of governors-general have been content to be quietly supportive. Some, however, have been notable in their own right, such as Dame Alexandra Hasluck, Lady Casey and Michael Bryce.

History

The office of "governor-general" was previously used in Australia in the mid-19th century. Sir Charles FitzRoy (Governor of New South Wales from 1846–1855) and Sir William Denison (Governor of New South Wales from 1855–1861) also carried the additional title of Governor-General because their jurisdiction extended to other colonies in Australia.

The office of governor-general for the Commonwealth of Australia was conceived during the debates and conventions leading up to federation. The first Governor-General, the Earl of Hopetoun, was a previous governor of Victoria. He was appointed in July 1900, returning to Australia shortly before the inauguration of the Commonwealth of Australia on 1 January 1901. After the initial confusion of the Hopetoun Blunder, he appointed the first prime minister of Australia, Edmund Barton, to a caretaker government, with the inaugural 1901 federal election not occurring until March.

Early governors-general were British and were appointed by the queen or king on the recommendation of the Colonial Office. The Australian Government was merely asked, as a matter of courtesy, whether they approved of the choice or not. Governors-general were expected to exercise a supervisory role over the Australian Government in the manner of a colonial governor. In a very real sense, they represented the British Government. They had the right to "reserve" legislation passed by the Parliament of Australia: in effect, to ask the Colonial Office in London for an opinion before giving the royal assent. They exercised this power several times.  The monarch, acting upon advice of the British Government, could also disallow any Australian legislation up to a year after the governor-general had given it the assent; although this power has never been used. These powers remain in section 59 of the Constitution of Australia, but today are regarded as dead letters.

The early governors-general frequently sought advice on the exercise of their powers from judges of the High Court of Australia, Sir Samuel Griffith and Sir Edmund Barton.

In 1919, Prime Minister Billy Hughes sent a memorandum to the Colonial Office in which he requested "a real and effective voice in the selection of the King's representative". He further proposed that the Dominions be able to nominate their own candidates and that "the field of selection should not exclude citizens of the Dominion itself". The memorandum met with strong opposition within the Colonial Office and was dismissed by Lord Milner, the Colonial Secretary; no response was given. The following year, as Ronald Munro Ferguson's term was about to expire, Hughes cabled the Colonial Office and asked that the appointment be made in accordance with the memorandum. To mollify Hughes, Milner offered him a choice between three candidates. After consulting his cabinet he chose Henry Forster, 1st Baron Forster. In 1925, under Prime Minister Stanley Bruce, the same practice was followed for the appointment of Forster's successor Lord Stonehaven, with the Australian government publicly stating that his name "had been submitted, with others, to the Commonwealth ministry, who had selected him".

During the 1920s, the importance of the position declined. As a result of decisions made at the 1926 Imperial Conference, the governor-general ceased to represent the British Government diplomatically, and the British right of supervision over Australian affairs was abolished. As the Balfour Declaration of 1926, later implemented as the Statute of Westminster 1931, put it:It is desirable formally to place on record a definition of the position held by the Governor-General as His Majesty's representative in the Dominions. That position, though now generally well recognised, undoubtedly represents a development from an earlier stage when the Governor-General was appointed solely on the advice of His Majesty's Ministers in London and acted also as their representative. In our opinion it is an essential consequence of the equality of status existing among the members of the British Commonwealth of Nations that the Governor-General of a Dominion is the representative of the Crown, holding in all essential respects the same position in relation to the administration of public affairs in the Dominion as is held by His Majesty the King in Great Britain, and that he is not the representative or agent of His Majesty's Government in Great Britain or of any Department of that Government. However, it remained unclear just whose prerogative it now became to decide who new governors-general would be. In 1930, King George V and the Australian Prime Minister James Scullin discussed the appointment of a new Governor-General to replace Lord Stonehaven, whose term was coming to an end. The King maintained that it was now his sole prerogative to choose a governor-general, and he wanted Field-Marshal Sir William Birdwood for the Australian post. Scullin recommended the Australian jurist Sir Isaac Isaacs, and he insisted that George V act on the advice of his Australian prime minister in this matter. Scullin was partially influenced by the precedent set by the Government of the Irish Free State, which always insisted upon having an Irishman as the governor-general of the Irish Free State.

Scullin's proposed appointment of Sir Isaac Isaacs was fiercely opposed by the British government. This was not because of any lack of regard for Isaacs personally, but because the British government considered that the choice of Governors-General was, since the 1926 Imperial Conference, a matter for the monarch's decision alone. (However, it became very clear in a conversation between Scullin and King George V's private secretary, Lord Stamfordham, on 11 November 1930, that this was merely the official reason for the objection, with the real reason being that an Australian, no matter how highly regarded personally, was not considered appropriate to be a governor-general.) Scullin was equally insistent that the monarch must act on the relevant prime minister's direct advice (the practice until 1926 was that Dominion prime ministers advised the monarch indirectly, through the British government, which effectively had a veto over any proposal it did not agree with). Scullin cited the precedents of the prime minister of South Africa, J. B. M. Hertzog, who had recently insisted on his choice of the Earl of Clarendon as governor-general of that country, and the selection of an Irishman as governor-general of the Irish Free State. Both of these appointments had been agreed to despite British government objections.

Despite these precedents, George V remained reluctant to accept Scullin's recommendation of Isaacs and asked him to consider Field Marshal Sir William Birdwood. However, Scullin stood firm, saying he would be prepared to fight a general election on the issue of whether an Australian should be prevented from becoming governor-general because he was Australian. On 29 November, the King agreed to Isaacs's appointment, but made it clear that he did so only because he felt he had no option. (Lord Stamfordham had complained that Scullin had "put a gun to the King's head".) 

The usual wording of official announcements of this nature read "The King has been pleased to appoint ...", but on this occasion the announcement said merely "The King has appointed ...", and his private secretary (Lord Stamfordham) asked the Australian solicitor-general, Sir Robert Garran, to make sure that Scullin was aware of the exact wording. The opposition Nationalist Party of Australia denounced the appointment as "practically republican", but Scullin had set a precedent. The convention gradually became established throughout the Commonwealth that the Governor-General is a citizen of the country concerned, and is appointed on the advice of the government of that country.

At the same time as the appointment of Isaacs as the first Australian-born governor-general, a separate role of British Representative in Australia (as the representative of the British government) was established, with Ernest Crutchley the first appointee. 1935 saw the appointment of the first British high commissioner to Australia, Geoffrey Whiskard (in office 1936–1941).

This right not only to advise the monarch directly, but also to expect that advice to be accepted, was soon taken up by all the other Dominion prime ministers. This, among other things, led to the Statute of Westminster 1931 and to the formal separation of the Crowns of the Dominions. 

After Scullin's defeat in 1931, non-Labor governments continued to recommend British people for appointment as governor-general, but such appointments remained solely a matter between the Australian government and the monarch. In 1947, Labor appointed a second Australian Governor-General, William McKell, who was in office as the Labor premier of New South Wales. The then leader of the Opposition, Robert Menzies, called McKell's appointment "shocking and humiliating".

In 1965 the Menzies conservative government appointed an Australian, Lord Casey, and thereafter only Australians have held the position. In 2007, media outlets reported that Prince William might become governor-general of Australia. Both the prime minister, John Howard, and Clarence House repudiated the suggestion.

Now, the King of Australia is generally bound by constitutional convention to accept the advice of the Australian prime minister and state premiers about Australian and state constitutional matters, respectively.

Backgrounds of governors-general
All the governors-general until 1965 were British-born, except for Australian-born Sir Isaac Isaacs (1931–1936) and Sir William McKell (1947–1953). There have been only Australian occupants since then, although Sir Ninian Stephen (1982–1989) had been born in Britain. Prince Henry, Duke of Gloucester, was a senior member of the royal family. Dame Quentin Bryce (2008–2014) was the first woman to be appointed to the office. Sir Isaac Isaacs and Sir Zelman Cowen were Jewish; Bill Hayden was an avowed atheist during his term and he made an affirmation rather than swear an oath at the beginning of his commission; the remaining Governors-General have been at least nominally Christian.

Various governors-general had previously served as governors of an Australian state or colony: Lord Hopetoun (Victoria 1889–1895); Lord Tennyson (South Australia 1899–1902); Lord Gowrie (South Australia 1928–34; and New South Wales 1935–1936); Major General Michael Jeffery (Western Australia 1993–2000); Dame Quentin Bryce (Queensland 2003–2008); General David Hurley (New South Wales 2014–2019). Sir Ronald Munro Ferguson had been offered the governorship of South Australia in 1895 and of Victoria in 1910, but refused both appointments. Lord Northcote was Governor of Bombay. Lord Casey was Governor of Bengal in between his periods of service to the Australian Parliament.

Former leading politicians and members of the judiciary have figured prominently. Lord Dudley was Lord Lieutenant of Ireland (1902–1905). Lord Stonehaven (as John Baird) was Minister for Transport in the Cabinets of Bonar Law and Stanley Baldwin; and after his return to Britain he became Chairman of the UK Conservative Party. Sir Isaac Isaacs was successively Commonwealth Attorney-General, a High Court judge, and Chief Justice. Sir William McKell was Premier of New South Wales. Lord Dunrossil (as William Morrison) was Speaker of the UK House of Commons. Lord De L'Isle was Secretary of State for Air in Winston Churchill's cabinet from 1951 to 1955. More recent governors-general in this category include Lord Casey, Sir Paul Hasluck, Sir John Kerr, Sir Ninian Stephen, Bill Hayden and Sir William Deane.

Of the eleven Australians appointed governor-general since 1965, Lord Casey, Sir Paul Hasluck and Bill Hayden were former federal parliamentarians; Sir John Kerr was the Chief Justice of the Supreme Court of New South Wales; Sir Ninian Stephen and Sir William Deane were appointed from the bench of the High Court; Sir Zelman Cowen was a vice-chancellor of the University of Queensland and constitutional lawyer; Peter Hollingworth was the Anglican Archbishop of Brisbane; and Major-General Michael Jeffery was a retired military officer and former Governor of Western Australia. Quentin Bryce's appointment was announced during her term as Governor of Queensland; she had previously been the Federal Sex Discrimination Commissioner. General David Hurley was a retired Chief of Defence Force and former Governor of New South Wales.

Significant post-retirement activities of earlier Governors-General have included: Lord Tennyson was appointed Deputy Governor of the Isle of Wight; Sir Ronald Munro Ferguson (by now Lord Novar) became Secretary of State for Scotland; and Lord Gowrie became Chairman of the Marylebone Cricket Club (Lord Forster had also held this post, before his appointment as governor-general).

List of governors-general of Australia

Timeline of governors-general

See also
 History of Australia
 Constitutional history of Australia
 Chapter II of the Constitution of Australia
 Governors of the Australian states
 Armorial of the governors-general of Australia
 British Empire
 Royal Australian Air Force VIP aircraft
 Governor-general (links to other countries which have Governors-General)
 Australian VIP transport
 Musical composition Earl's March written by Australian author Walter J. Turner in 1889 dedicated to Adrian Hope, whilst in office.

References

Further reading
 
 
 
  (pp 515, 519, 548)

External links

 
 
 
 
   "The Constitution as in force on 1 June 2003 together with proclamation declaring the establishment of the Commonwealth, letters patent relating to the Office of Governor-General, Statute of Westminster Adoption Act 1942, Australia Act 1986."
 A Mirror to the People a 58-minute documentary film on the Office of Governor-General of Australia 1999. Dir: Daryl Dellora. Features Sir William Deane, Sir Zelman Cowen, Sir Ninian Stephen. Special Commendation ATOM Awards.

Governors-General of Australia
Westminster system
Monarchy in Australia
Parliament of Australia
1975 Australian constitutional crisis
1901 establishments in Australia